Possenhofen Castle is located in the  town of Possenhofen on the western shore of Lake Starnberg in Bavaria, Germany.

History

The castle was built in 1536 by Jakob Rosenbusch, was destroyed during the Thirty Years' War, then rebuilt. It passed through various owners before being bought in 1834 by Maximilian, Duke in Bavaria, father of "Sisi", the future Empress Elisabeth (wife of Emperor Franz Joseph I of Austria); thus, the castle is best remembered today as her childhood home and favourite vacation retreat.

The castle served as a seat of the Dukes in Bavaria, a junior branch of the House of Wittelsbach, until it became derelict after 1920.  Duke Luitpold Emanuel Ludwig Maria in Bavaria (1890-1973) sold it, as well as Biederstein Castle in Munich-Schwabing, in order to build his late romantic Schloss Ringberg.  Possenhofen Castle subsequently served various functions—children's home, hospital, even a motorcycle repair shop—until being restored and converted to flats in the 1980s. The street address is Karl-Theodor-Strasse 14, Possenhofen.

The food company Gebrüder Bagusat GmbH & Co. KG was founded in the Possenhofen castle in 1958.

References 

Buildings and structures in Starnberg (district)
Castles in Bavaria